Commissioned in 1969 AD, Phewa Hydropower is the first hydropower plant in the city of Pokhara. Water from Phewa Lake is directed to this powerplant to produce 1 Megawatt of electricity from 4 generators.

References

Hydroelectric power stations in Nepal
Buildings and structures in Pokhara
1969 establishments in Nepal